The 2008 BMW PGA Championship was the 54th edition of the BMW PGA Championship, an annual professional golf tournament on the European Tour. It was held 22–25 May at the West Course of Wentworth Club in Virginia Water, Surrey, England, a suburb southwest of London.

Spaniard Miguel Ángel Jiménez defeated Englishman Oliver Wilson in a playoff to capture his first BMW PGA Championship title.

Course layout

Past champions in the field 
Eight former champions entered the tournament.

Made the cut

Missed the cut

Nationalities in the field

Round summaries

First round 
Thursday, 22 May 2008

Second round 
Friday, 23 May 2008

Third round 
Saturday, 24 May 2008

Final round 
Sunday, 25 May 2008

Scorecard

Cumulative tournament scores, relative to par

Source:

Playoff 
The playoff began on the par five 18th; both players went for the green in two. Wilson ended up in the greenside bunker; Jiménez at the back of the green. Jiménez three-putted for a par 5 which was matched by Wilson.

The players headed once again for the 18th tee, this time Jiménez was able to get home in two after a superb drive; Wilson, on the other hand could only manage a lay up after he missed his tee shot to the right. Wilson managed to play his approach shot to 12 feet (3.6m), but his putt slipped by. Jiménez managed to two-putt for a birdie 4 and the title.

References 

BMW PGA Championship
Golf tournaments in England
BMW PGA Championship
BMW PGA Championship
BMW PGA Championship